Mandela: The Living Legend is a 2003 BBC documentary on the life of activist Nelson Mandela. It is a two-part documentary created by Dominic Allan with a one-person crew. Writing for The Guardian, Kathryn Flett described the documentary as "reverent and occasionally revealing" but concluded that it "wasn't the most penetrating and wildly insightful documentary ever made". In a review of Mandela: Long Walk to Freedom in Grantland, Wesley Morris described Mandela: The Living Legend as "chillingly patient" and "perfectly narrated by David Dimbleby".

References

2003 documentary films
2003 films
Documentary films about Nelson Mandela
South African documentary films
BBC television documentaries
2003 television films
2000s British films